is a Japanese manga artist from Nagoya, Aichi Prefecture, Japan. She resides in Tokyo.

Her one shot  was published in the March 2013 issue of Hakusensha's bi-monthly shōjo manga magazine LaLa DX.

Career
Akane Ogura began her career as a manga artist with her first work entitled Purity 999.9 which was published in LaLa DX's July issue of 2001. She gained the Fresh Debut award in the 26th LaLa Manga Grand Prix with Purity 999.9.

In October of the same year,  was also published in LaLa DX's November issue. The following month,  appeared in LaLa DX's January issue of 2002. It was later compiled into the first volume of Ogura's second series Mademoiselle Butterfly.

On April 10, 2002,  was published in LaLa DX's May issue. Soon after, she began her first short work consisting of two chapters, . The chapters were published in LaLa DX's January and March issue of 2003 respectively. They were never collected into tankōbon.

Exactly a year after she published Mayonaka mo Jugyōchū, a one-shot titled  appeared in LaLa DX's March issue of 2004. In LaLa DX's November issue, Ogura started serializing her first series, .

In between the serializations of Mademoiselle Butterfly, she managed to do another one-shot,  which was published in the September issue of LaLa. After having nine chapters, Mademoiselle Butterfly ended in the September 2006 issue of LaLa DX. It was compiled into two volumes. The series was also given the Outstanding Debut award in the 30th Hakusensha Athena Newcomers' Award. She continued working by having  in the November issue of LaLa.

In 2007, she published another short work which consisted of three chapters titled  in LaLa DX. It was serialized between January and May of the same year. Like Mayonaka mo Jugyōchū, it was not collected into tankōbon. Later in September, she began a new series in LaLa DX titled  which ended in 2010. It has been collected into 4 volumes.
A one-shot,  was published in the November issue of LaLa DX of the same year. In 2008, aside from working on her series Zettai Heiwa Daisakusen, she published a one-shot titled  in LaLa Special.

Her manga  is serialized in AneLaLa while  is serialised in LalaDX. Both series have been collected in tankōbon. The first volumes were released on July 5, 2013 and May 2, 2014 respectively. The second volume of Kanojo ni Naru Hi another will be released on March 5, 2015.

Works

One-shots
Beni'iro Kyōsō Kyoku
Kimi no Omoide
Watashi no Suteki na Hito
Ō-sama Yūgi
Natsu no Requiem
Ojō-sama to Amai Yū'utsu
Dr. Rabbit
Genius House
Rhapsodia in Blue
Eikyū Shōjo

Sent-in works
Purity 999.9

Short works
Mayonaka mo Jugyōchū
Ten'imuhō Princess

Series
Mademoiselle Butterfly
Zettai Heiwa Daisakusen
Kanojo ni Naru Hi
Kanojo ni Naru Hi another

References

External links
La Garance – Official website 
Official blog 
Hakusensha's Interview with Akane Ogura for Mademoiselle Butterfly 

People from Nagoya
Living people
Year of birth missing (living people)
Japanese female comics artists
Female comics writers
Women manga artists